The 1993 NAIA World Series was the 37th annual tournament hosted by the National Association of Intercollegiate Athletics to determine the national champion of baseball among its member colleges and universities in the United States and Canada.

The tournament was again played at Sec Taylor Stadium in Des Moines, Iowa.

Saint Francis (IL) (46-16-2) defeated Southeastern Oklahoma State (43–19) in a single-game championship series, 4–2, to win the Fighting Saints' first NAIA World Series. It was the fourth title for Saint Francis coach Gordie Gillespie, who won three NAIA World Series with Lewis in 1974, 1975, and 1976.

Saint Francis pitcher and outfielder Ivan Lawler was named tournament MVP.

Bracket

Preliminary

Championship

See also
 1993 NCAA Division I baseball tournament
 1993 NCAA Division II baseball tournament
 1993 NCAA Division III baseball tournament
 1993 NAIA Softball World Series

Reference

|NAIA World Series
NAIA World Series
NAIA World Series
NAIA World Series